Noraollah Amiri (Dari: نورالله امیری, born 23 August 1991) is an Afghan footballer who plays as a midfielder who plays for Ariana FC.

Club career

Trelleborgs FF
In April 2015, Amiri signed with Trelleborgs FF. He made his league debut for the club on 13 April 2015 in a 3-2 home victory over Eskilsminne. He was subbed on for Furkan Motori in the 66th minute. He scored his first league goal for the club as part of a brace on 16 August 2015 in a 7-0 home victory over Norrby. He scored in the 8th and 25th minutes. In July 2017, it was revealed that Amiri's contract would not be extended and he would be released following the end of the season.

Rosengard
On 1 August 2017, Amiri was loaned out to FC Rosengård. He made his league debut for the club on 19 August 2017 in a 2-1 away defeat to Skövde AIK. He was subbed on for Ismael Hussein at halftime.

Return to Lunds BK
On 22 December 2017, Amiri rejoined former club Lunds BK in Division 1.

Ariana FC
Amiri joined Ariana FC in July 2018.

International career
Amiri made his league debut for Afghanistan on 16 June 2015 in a 1-0 away victory over Cambodia in World Cup Qualifying. In August 2015, Amiri was called up once again for a World Cup Qualifier against Japan and a friendly against Thailand.

International goals

References

External links
 
 

1991 births
Living people
Afghan men's footballers
Afghanistan international footballers
Swedish footballers
Swedish people of Afghan descent
Sportspeople of Afghan descent
BK Olympic players
KSF Prespa Birlik players
Lunds BK players
Trelleborgs FF players
FC Rosengård 1917 players
Footballers from Malmö
Association football midfielders